The Kharagpur–Purulia Intercity Express is an Intercity train belonging to South Eastern Railway zone that runs between  and  in India. It is currently being operated with 22875/22876 train numbers on tri-weekly basis.

Service

The 22875/Kharagpur–Purulia Intercity Express has an average speed of 52 km/hr and covers 208 km in 4h. The 22876/Purulia–Kharagpur Intercity Express has an average speed of 53 km/hr and covers 208 km in 3h 55m.

Route and halts 

The important halts of the train are:

Coach composition

The train has standard ICF rakes with a max speed of 110 kmph. The train consists of 9 coaches:

 1 Second Sitting
 7 General Unreserved
 2 Seating cum Luggage Rake

Traction

Both trains are hauled by a Santragachi Loco Shed-based WAM-4 electric locomotive from Kharagpur to Purulia and vice versa.

Rake sharing

The train shares its rake with 12865/12866 Lalmati Express and 22821/22822 Birsa Munda Express.

See also 

 Kharagpur Junction railway station
 Purulia Junction railway station
 Lalmati Express
 Birsa Munda Express

Notes

References

External links 

 22875/Kharagpur–Purulia Intercity Express India Rail Info
 22876/Purulia–Kharagpur Intercity Express India Rail Info

Intercity Express (Indian Railways) trains
Rail transport in West Bengal
Rail transport in Jharkhand
Transport in Kharagpur